Dumitru Popovici (born 5 August 1983) is a Moldovan footballer.

Career
Popovici appeared in an Intertoto Cup first round match for Tiligul Tiraspol against Pogoń Szczecin on 18 June 2005. He would move abroad to play in Syria, and participated in the 2007 AFC Champions League with Al-Ittihad (Aleppo).

In 2009, Popovici signed with FC Dacia Chişinău and made his first and only appearance for the senior Moldova national football team. He had previously played for the U-19 and U-21 national teams.

References

External links 
 
 
 Popovici profile - fcdacia.md
 
 

1983 births
Living people
Moldovan footballers
Moldova international footballers
Moldovan expatriate footballers
Association football forwards
FC Sheriff Tiraspol players
Al-Ittihad Aleppo players
FC Dacia Chișinău players
FC Tighina players
CS Tiligul-Tiras Tiraspol players
PFK Nurafshon players
FC Saxan players
CSF Bălți players
FC Dinamo-Auto Tiraspol players
Syrian Premier League players
Moldovan expatriate sportspeople in Uzbekistan
Expatriate footballers in Syria
Expatriate footballers in Uzbekistan
FC Tiraspol players